Hancock is an unincorporated community in Longswamp Township in Berks County, Pennsylvania, United States. Hancock is located at the intersection of State Street and Park Avenue.

References

Unincorporated communities in Berks County, Pennsylvania
Unincorporated communities in Pennsylvania